"Back to Love" is a song by American singer Chris Brown. It was released by RCA Records on April 11, 2019, serving as the second single from Chris Brown's ninth studio album Indigo.

The song received positive reviews from music critics who celebrated its lyrical content and its production, praising the intention from Brown to bring himself close to his early R&B roots, comparing it to some works from his Grammy Award winning album F.A.M.E., and to Michael Jackson's music from the 1990s as well. While receiving positive reception from critics, the single became the lowest charting single from Indigo.

Background
Chris Brown teased the song with a post on his Instagram account, while he was performing a choreography for it.

Composition and lyrics
The song was written by Chris Brown and Mark Pitts, and was produced by Cam Wallace. "Back to Love" runs for three minutes and forty two seconds. The instrumentation is dominated by percussive elements and a slapping snare. The song is also bass-heavy while featuring extended guitar chords, riffs, and a woodwind synth that makes an appearance halfway through the track.
 
The song is about a man that wants to leave his past behind him, apologizing to his girlfriend, for mistreating her, needing to get back to love in the correct way, thanking her for helping him to open his eyes, promising to be a better man.

Critical reception
Andy Kellman of AllMusic defined the song as a "career highlight". Alex Zidel of HotNewHipHop said that the song is "lyrically deep and conscious, while musically has a worldwide and timeless sound", noticing that with "Back to Love", and his previous single "Undecided", Brown is successfully trying to bring himself close to his early R&B roots. Ken Hamm of SoulBounce described the song as "meaningful", saying that the song is a revival of Michael Jackson's music from the 1990s.

Music video
The music video was directed by Brown, and released the same day that the song was released. The video was shot in Paris, and starts with Brown escaping some paparazzi, being driven to the Seine's edge where he shows off different dance moves in front of what appears to be an illuminated well. Groups of dancing children from across the globe make cameos throughout the music video as Chris Brown continues to display his dancing ability in the midst of rows of columns which later morph into striped moving pillars.
 
The Back to Love video was compared by many to Michael Jackson's music videos, suggesting the "King of Pop" as an inspiration for it.

Credits and personnel
Credits adapted from Tidal.
 
Chris Brown - vocals, lyrics, composer
Cameron Wallace - producer, composer
Mark Pitts - lyrics, composer
Nathan Perez - composer
Atia Boggs - composer
Keith Thomas - composer
Ben Chang - assistant engineer
Randy Merril - mastering engineer
Patrizio Pigliapoco - mixing engineer, recording engineer

Charts

Release history

References

2019 singles
Chris Brown songs
Songs written by Chris Brown
2019 songs
Songs written by Soundz
Songs written by Eric Bellinger
Songs written by OG Parker
Songs written by Scott Storch
Songs written by Happy Perez